Iancu may refer to:

Surname
Andrei Iancu (born 1968), American engineer and intellectual property attorney
Aurel Iancu (born 1928), Romanian economist, member of the Romanian Academy
Avram Iancu (1824–1872), Transylvanian Romanian revolutionary
Constantin Iancu (bobsleigh) (born 1948), Romanian bobsledder
Costel Iancu, Romanian politician who has been involved in a scandal
Gabriel Iancu (born 1994), Romanian professional footballer
Ionuț Iancu (born 1994), Romanian handballer
Iulius Iancu (born 1920), Jewish poet and writer writing in Romanian
Marcel Hermann Iancu (1895–1984), Romanian and Israeli visual artist, architect and art theorist
Marian Iancu (born 1965), Romanian businessman, president of oil company Balkan Petroleum (UK) Ltd
Marius Iancu (born 1976), Romanian singer and DJ (stage name Morris)
Vlad Iancu (born 1978), Romanian futsal player

Given name
Iancu Dumitrescu (born 1944), Romanian avant-garde composer
Iancu Flondor (1865–1924), Romanian politician who advocated Bukovina's unifion with the Kingdom of Romania
Iancu Jianu (1787–1842), Wallachian Romanian hajduk
Iancu Kalinderu (1840–1913), Wallachian, later Romanian jurist and confidant of King Carol I
Iancu Manu (1803–1874), Romanian boyar and politician
Iancu Sasul (died 1582), the bastard son of Petru Rareș and the wife of Brașov Transylvanian Saxon Iorg (Jürgen) Weiss
Iancu Țucărman (1922–2021), Romanian Jewish agricultural engineer and Holocaust survivor
Iancu Văcărescu (1786–1863), Romanian Wallachian boyar and poet, member of the Văcărescu family
Iancu Constantin Vissarion (1879–1951), Romanian prose writer

See also 

Ianchuk
Iancului
Jianchu (disambiguation)

Romanian masculine given names
Romanian-language surnames
Surnames from given names